Lists of members of the Canadian House of Commons cover the members elected to the House of Commons of Canada, the lower chamber of the bicameral Parliament of Canada. Seats in the House of Commons are distributed roughly in proportion to the population of each province and territory. The lists of members are organized alphabetically, by age and by parliament.

Alphabetical

By Parliament

 1st (1867–1872)
 2nd (1873–1874)
 3rd (1874–1878)
 4th (1879–1882)
 5th (1883–1887)
 6th (1887–1891)
 7th (1891–1896)
 8th (1896–1900)
 9th (1901–1904)
 10th (1905–1908)
 11th (1908–1911)
 12th (1911–1917)
 13th (1918–1921)
 14th (1922–1925)
 15th (1926)
 16th (1926–1930)
 17th (1930–1935)
 18th (1936–1940)
 19th (1940–1945)
 20th (1945–1949)
 21st (1949–1953)
 22nd (1953–1957)
 23rd (1957–1958)
 24th (1958–1962)
 25th (1962–1963)
 26th (1963–1965)
 27th (1966–1968)
 28th (1968–1972)
 29th (1973–1974)
 30th (1974–1979)
 31st (1979)
 32nd (1980–1984)
 33rd (1984–1988)
 34th (1988–1993)
 35th (1994–1997)
 36th (1997–2000)
 37th (2001–2004)
 38th ( 2004–2005)
 39th (2006–2008)
 40th (2008–2011)
 41st (2011–2015)
 42nd (2015–2019)
 43rd (2019–2021)
 44th (2021–present)

By election of defeat 

 List of MPs who lost their seat in the 2011 Canadian federal election
 List of MPs who lost their seat in the 2015 Canadian federal election
 List of MPs who lost their seat in the 2019 Canadian federal election

House of Commons, members